Party of the Iranian People or Iran's People's Party ( hezb-e mardom-e Irân) was an Iranian political organization within the National Front and 'National Resistance Movement'. The party was based on a similar line followed by the Movement of God-Worshipping Socialists and an Islamic socialist–Iranian nationalist platform.

References

1949 establishments in Iran
Defunct nationalist parties
Defunct socialist parties in Iran
Iranian nationalism
Islamic political parties in Iran
Islamic socialist political parties
National Front (Iran) affiliated parties
Nationalist parties in Iran
Political parties established in 1949
Political parties in Pahlavi Iran (1941–1979)
Political parties with year of disestablishment missing
Republican parties